Rosetta Head, known as Kongkengguwar by the Ramindjeri people but more commonly known as The Bluff, is a headland located on the south coast of Fleurieu Peninsula  in Encounter Bay, South Australia, within the local government area of the City of Victor Harbor.

Description
Its southern tip is considered by Australian authorities as being the western extent of Encounter Bay.  On its northern side, there is a small wharf which is connected to the adjoining urban area by a road and which adjoins a body of water is known as Rosetta Harbor.  On its southern side, there is a small cove called Petrel Cove.

Formation, geology and oceanography
Rosetta Head as a headland was formed when the sea reached its present level 7,500 years ago after sea levels started to rise at the start of the Holocene.  As a landform, it is a large domed inselberg which is considered to be "the most prominent feature along Encounter Bay coastline" and whose form is due to its origins via the geological processes of metamorphism and intrusion followed by two phases of erosion; firstly via the action of a northward-moving glacier during the Permian which created the distinctive dome shape and then by wave action from the south due to the sea level rise during the Holocene.  When viewed from the adjoining coastline, it is considered to be a typical example of a glacial terrain known as a roche moutonnee.
Geologically, Rosetta Head is the result of the intrusion of molten granite (known as Encounter Bay Granite) into a grey metamorphic rock (known as the Kanmantoo group), which was subsequently elevated as part of a mountain-building event known as the Delamerian Orogeny between 475 and 500 million years ago.

History

Aboriginal occupation
Although traditional ownership of Encounter Bay has long been ascribed to the Ramindjeri clan of the Ngarrindjeri people, linguist Rob Amery of the University of Adelaide suggested in a 1998 paper that Kaurna traditional lands "may have extended as far eastward as Encounter Bay and that the occupation of Encounter Bay by the Ramindjeri in the late 1830s may have been a response to the activities of whalers in the area". He also notes that the "Encounter Bay people" mentioned in 1836 by Colonel Light and his party at Rapid Bay in 1836 spoke the Kaurna language.

European discovery and use
Rosetta Head was the site of a whaling station, with its peak used as a look-out point to locate whales.  The station was established in 1837 and operated until the early 1860s.
The wharf, an adjacent sea wall and the connecting road were completed in 1856 by the SA Government to assist whaling industry activity. A mine was established on Rosetta Head in 1863 to search for copper and other minerals until the abandonment of the venture in 1866. A tablet set into a granite boulder located near Rosetta Head's summit was unveiled on 8 April 1902 by the Governor of South Australia, The Right Honourable Hallam, Baron Tennyson, KCMG to commemorate the centenary of the meeting of the European explorers, Matthew Flinders and Nicolas Baudin, in nearby waters.

Naming

The Ramindjeri language name for Encounter Bay was Ramong, although some sources ascribe this name to The Bluff only. The name Kongkengguwar is however more commonly ascribed to The Bluff.

Rosetta Head was given its modern name in 1839 after Rosetta French, the wife of George Fife Angas reportedly by George Gawler, the second Governor of South Australia. The use of the name "The Bluff" which is the most commonly used name for the headland is attributed to whalers operating in the locality prior to the adoption of the name Rosetta Head.

Heritage listings
Rosetta Head  was listed on the now-defunct Register of the National Estate on 21 October 1980. It was listed on the South Australian Heritage Register on 1 September 1983.

Current land use
Rosetta Head is used as a public recreation reserve which is managed by the City of Victor Harbor.  A walking trail ascends to the summit where views of the adjoining coastline including the Victor Harbor urban area and the nearby islands are available as well as the opportunity to observe southern right whales in the nearby waters between the months of May and November.  As of 2007, a proposal existed to connect the Rosetta Head walking trail to the Heysen Trail to its west via a trail following the coastline.
A sandy beach on the north side of Rosetta Head is notable as a site for swimming while the wharf is used for recreational fishing.  A sandy beach on the south side of the head at Petrel Cove is known for its surfing and surf fishing but is considered to be a hazardous location for swimming.  The sea around Rosetta Head is a popular site for recreational diving and is notable as a place to see Leafy sea dragons.

Gallery

References

Headlands of South Australia
South Australian places listed on the defunct Register of the National Estate
South Australian Heritage Register
Fleurieu Peninsula
Whaling stations in Australia